The Devil's Den, McClurg Covered Bridge is a historic King post truss covered bridge in Paris, Pennsylvania.  Built in 1880, the bridge originally was part of Devil's Den Road and crossed Kings Creek in Paris, PA.  The bridge was relocated to its present location in 1987.  It crosses a small ravine in Hanover Township Park along Old Steubenville Pike. It is only open to foot traffic.  It is 12'3" wide and 24' long, with red vertical plank siding, three rectangular windows on each side, and a cedar shake roof.  The bridge is part of an annual Covered Bridge Festival.

It is designated as a historic bridge by the Washington County History & Landmarks Foundation.

References

External links
[ National Register nomination form]
Hanover Township Park [http://www.hanovertwp.net/parkactivities.htm Hanover Township Park]

Covered bridges on the National Register of Historic Places in Pennsylvania
Covered bridges in Washington County, Pennsylvania
National Register of Historic Places in Washington County, Pennsylvania
Road bridges on the National Register of Historic Places in Pennsylvania
Wooden bridges in Pennsylvania
King post truss bridges in the United States